The 1952 SEC men's basketball tournament took place February 28–March 1, 1952 in Louisville, Kentucky at the Jefferson County Armory. This tournament marks the final SEC Men’s Basketball Tournament held until the event’s 26-year hiatus ended prior to the 1979 tournament.

The Kentucky Wildcats won the tournament championship game by beating , 44–43. Kentucky would go on to play in the 16-team 1952 NCAA tournament, but fell in the East Regional Final to St. John's.

Bracket

 = denotes overtime game

References

SEC men's basketball tournament
1951–52 Southeastern Conference men's basketball season
Basketball in Kentucky
SEC Basket